Kagerise Store and House, also known as the Harting's Store, is a historic commercial building and residence located at Adamstown in Lancaster County, Pennsylvania. The original section was built in 1827, with later additions between 1850 and 1870.  It is a -story, six bay, "U"-shaped sandstone building. The elaborate bracketed porch was added about 1890. The building has elements of Federal and Eastlake movement-style details.  Also on the property is a contributing barn (c. 1840).

It was listed on the National Register of Historic Places in 1988.

References 

Commercial buildings on the National Register of Historic Places in Pennsylvania
Federal architecture in Pennsylvania
Queen Anne architecture in Pennsylvania
Commercial buildings completed in 1827
Buildings and structures in Lancaster County, Pennsylvania
Houses in Lancaster County, Pennsylvania
National Register of Historic Places in Lancaster County, Pennsylvania
1827 establishments in Pennsylvania